Dawid Kruiper (1 September 1935 – 13 June 2012) was a traditional healer and leader of the ǂKhomani San in the Kalahari.

Well known for his acting role in The Gods Must Be Crazy II, Kruiper spoke for the rights of indigenous people to the United Nations in 1994, and led the way for successful land-claims for the San people in South Africa, culminating in the restoration of 40,000 hectares of land in 1999.

He also made headlines after hitch-hiking from the Kalahari to Cape Town in 2004 to speak to then South African president Thabo Mbeki, and was also involved in the development and restoration of the San languages.

Kruiper was born in the Kalahari National Park. He was outspoken on the theft of traditional knowledge, particularly regarding hoodia, by western pharmaceutical companies.

Kruiper died at approximately noon on June 13, 2012 at Upington Medi-Clinic in Upington. He had been transferred there from Gordonia Regional Hospital on June 12, 2012 after his condition abruptly deteriorated at night. Family representative Anna Festus told news media that Kruiper had been doing better during the weekend prior to the deterioration. Specifics of his medical condition and cause of death were not reported.

Legacy  
Cape Town has the Dawid Kruiper Bridge that crosses over Nelson Mandela Boulevard.

See also 
Dawid Kruiper Local Municipality

References 

South African politicians
San people
South African male film actors
1940s births
Year of birth uncertain
2012 deaths